Michiel Maddersteg (1662–1708) was a Dutch painter.

Maddersteg was born in Enkhuizen and baptized on January 5, 1662.  His father was an artist.

He studied under Ludolf Backhuysen. He mainly painted maritime scenes. He spent most of his life at the court of Frederick I of Prussia, but returned to Amsterdam later in life, where he commissioned the building of two beautiful ships for the pleasure of Frederick I. He died in Berlin in 1708. Most of his paintings are in Germany, since he spent so many years at court in Brandenburg.

References

 
 :nl:Maddersteg

1659 births
1709 deaths
Painters from Amsterdam
Dutch Golden Age painters
Dutch male painters
Dutch marine artists